The 2009 Pekao Szczecin Open was a professional tennis tournament played on outdoor red clay courts. It was the seventeenth edition of the tournament which was part of the Tretorn SERIE+ of the 2009 ATP Challenger Tour. It took place in Szczecin, Poland between 14 and 20 September 2009.

Singles main draw entrants

Seeds

 Rankings are as of August 31, 2009.

Other entrants
The following players received wildcards into the singles main draw:
  Marcin Gawron
  Rafał Gozdur
  Albert Montañés
  Grzegorz Panfil

The following players received a Special Exempt into the singles main draw:
  Albert Ramos-Viñolas

The following players received entry from the qualifying draw:
  Ladislav Chramosta
  Mateusz Kowalczyk
  Axel Michon
  Dmitri Sitak

Champions

Singles

 Evgeny Korolev def.  Florent Serra, 6–4, 6–3

Doubles

 Tomasz Bednarek /  Mateusz Kowalczyk def.  Oleksandr Dolgopolov Jr. /  Artem Smirnov, 6–3, 6–4

References
Official website
ITF Search 
2009 Draws

Pekao Open
Pekao Szczecin Open
Pekao